Siphelele is a South African given name. Notable people with the name include:

Siphelele Gasa (born 1984), South African cricket umpire
Siphelele Luthuli (born 1995), South African soccer player
Siphelele Mthembu (born 1987), South African football striker 
Siphelele Ntshangase (born 1993), South African football player 

African given names